Bagasbas Airport (Filipino: Paliparan ng Bagasbas, Bikol: Palayogan nin Bagasbas) , also known as Daet Airport, is an airport serving the general area of the town of Daet, located in the province of Camarines Norte in the Philippines.  It is the only airport in Camarines Norte.  The airport is classified as a secondary airport, or a minor commercial domestic airport, by the Air Transportation Office, a body of the Department of Transportation that is responsible for the operations of all airports in the Philippines except the major international airports.

The airport, in service since the 1930s, derives its name from its location in Barangay Bagasbas in Daet.

See also
List of airports in the Philippines
Barangay Bagasbas

References

Airports in the Philippines
Transportation in Camarines Norte
Buildings and structures in Camarines Norte